The 2010 Touring Car Masters was Australian motor racing competition for Touring Cars. The series was open to models manufactured between 1 January 1963 and 31 December 1973 and to specific models manufactured between 1 January 1974 and 31 December 1976. It was sanctioned by the Confederation of Australian Motor Sport (CAMS) as a National Series and ‘Australian Classic Touring Cars’ was appointed by CAMS as the Category Manager. The series was the fourth annual Touring Car Masters.

Jim Richards (Ford Falcon Sprint) won Group 1, Bernie Stack (Porsche 911 RS) was victorious in Group 2 and Tony Karanfilovski (Alfa Romeo GTAm) secured the Group 3 award.

Calendar

The series was contested over eight rounds.

Note: 
 Race 2 of Round 6 at Symmons Plains was cancelled due to scheduling issues brought about by damage caused to the safety fencing during the previous race.
 Race 2 of Round 7 at Sandown was cut short due to an accident and was deemed a non-event.

Classes
Cars competed in three Groups based on engine capacity:
 Group 1: Over 5100cc (plus Ford Falcon Sprint and Holden Torana SL/R 5000)	
 Group 2: Over 2001cc and up to 5099cc		
 Group 3: Up to 2000cc

Points system
Series points were awarded on the following basis within each Group at each race.

Series standings

Note:
 Each driver was required to drop points from one round of the series. Points which were not retained are shown in the above table within brackets.
 Due to an engine irregularity, Andrew Miedecke nominated Adelaide as the round for which his points would be dropped.

Notes & references

Touring Car Masters
Touring Car Masters